The Aurangabad Municipal Corporation (AMC) is the governing body of the city of Aurangabad in the Indian state of Maharashtra. The municipal corporation consists of democratically elected members, is headed by a mayor and administers the city's infrastructure, public services and police. Members from the state's leading various political parties hold elected offices in the corporation. Aurangabad municipal corporation is located in Aurangabad.

Administration
Aurangabad Municipal Corporation (AMC) is the local civil body. It is divided into nine zones. The Municipal Council was established in 1936, the Municipal Council area was about 54.5 km2. It was elevated to the status of Municipal Corporation from 8 December 1982, and simultaneously including eighteen peripheral villages, making total area under its jurisdiction to 138.5 km2 extended its limits.

The city is divided in 115 electoral wards called as Prabhag, and each ward is represented by a Corporator elected by the people from each ward. There are two Committees, General Body and Standing Committee headed by the Mayor and the chairman respectively. AMC is responsible for providing basic amenities like drinking water, drainage facility, road, street lights, health care facilities, primary schools, etc. AMC collects its revenue from the urban taxes which are imposed on citizens. The administration is headed by the Municipal Commissioner; an I.A.S. Officer, assisted by the other officers of different departments.

List of Mayor

List of Deputy Mayor

Administrative Rule 
According to the provisions of Article 2437 of the Indian Constitution and 66 (A) of the Maharashtra Municipal Corporation Act, 1949, the term of a municipal corporation is five years. Also, in accordance with the provisions of the Municipal Corporation Act and especially the provisions of Section 452 (A) and (B), Due to delayed in election because of COVID-19 pandemic and other reasons the State Government appointed Astik kumar pandey(IAS), the commissioner of corporation as the Administrator for the management of the corporation.

Revenue sources 

The following are the Income sources for the corporation from the Central and State Government.

Revenue from taxes 
Following is the Tax related revenue for the corporation.

 Property tax.
 Profession tax.
 Entertainment tax.
 Grants from Central and State Government like Goods and Services Tax.
 Advertisement tax.

Revenue from non-tax sources 

Following is the Non Tax related revenue for the corporation.

 Water usage charges.
 Fees from Documentation services.
 Rent received from municipal property.
 Funds from municipal bonds.

Party Composition

Corporation Election

Political Performance in Election 2015 

On Shiv Sena's victory in corporation, Aditya Thackeray, the head of Yuva Sena, a youth wing of Shiv Sena said, "We will not sit at home after our win, we will fulfill all promises that we made during our election campaign. We will make this city stone free and there will be footpaths and clean smooth roads everywhere."

References 

Municipal corporations in Maharashtra
Government of Aurangabad, Maharashtra
1972 establishments in Maharashtra